The Panasonic Lumix DC-GX850/GX800 (also known as the GF9 in some regions) is an interchangeable lens mirrorless system digital camera announced by Panasonic on January 4, 2017.

It uses the same 16MP Four Thirds sensor as several of its siblings. It is sold with a 12-32mm collapsible f/3.5-5.6 ASPH. MEGA O.I.S. kits lens and includes a 180-degree 3-inch flip-up touch LCD with a 1,040k-dot resolution, Panasonic's Depth-from-Defocus AF, built-in WiFi, and 4K 3840 x 2160 video capture.

The camera also offers Face Detection Focusing, a max ISO of 25600 and Timelapse Recording. However, it doesn't include in-body image stabilization, an external flash shoe, or a built-in viewfinder.

References

GF7